The 2013 European Shotgun Championships (Running Target & Shotgun) were held in Suhl, Germany. 14 events were held over the competition's length, including 10 events for men and 4 for women. The competition was held over 11 days.

Men's events

Women's events

Men's Junior events

Women's Junior events

Medal summary

Seniors

Juniors

References

External links
German Shooting Federation Website
Results book

European Shooting Championships
European Shooting Championships
2013 European Shooting Championships
European Shotgun Championships
Suhl
Sport in Thuringia
Shooting competitions in Germany
2010s in Thuringia